William Barbosa' may refer to:

William Barbosa (footballer, born 1978), Brazilian football midfielder
William Barbosa (footballer, born 1983), Santomean football centre-back

See also
Willyan da Silva Barbosa (born 1994) Brazilian footballer
Willian Xavier Barbosa (born 1983) Brazilian footballer